Kreuzschwinger are seating or lounging furniture. They were invented by the German architect and industrial designer Till Behrens in the 1950s.

Construction 
Kreuzschwinger are made out of stainless steel that swing gently back and forth without mechanical help. They automatically adapt to posture changes. Kreuzschwinger are often wrongly assigned to the Cantilever chair

Collections (Selection)Gallery Haasner: Kreuzschwinger 

  Museum für Angewandte Kunst Frankfurt
 Deutsches Architekturmuseum
 Museum für Kunst und Gewerbe Hamburg
  Badisches Landesmuseum
 Fridericianum
 Die Neue Sammlung
 Vitra Design Museum
  Museum für angewandte Kunst Wien
 Deutsches Technikmuseum Berlin
 Germanisches Nationalmuseum
 Stiftung Simonshof
 Stiftung Schleswig-Holsteinische Landesmuseen

Exhibitions / Awards (Selection)Gallery Haasner: Till Behrens 

 1986: design center Stuttgart
 1986: Haus Industriereform Essen
 1987: design center Stuttgart
 1987: Haus Industriereform Essen
 1994: Deutscher Designer Club
 1995: Designpreis für Langlebigkeit, Stuttgart
 1996: Busse Longlife Design Award
 1996: "Dynamisches Sitzen" in "Institut für Neue Technische Form", Darmstadt
 1997: Internationaler Designpreis Baden-Württemberg
 2008: Busse Longlife Design Award
 2008: „Flexible Kreuze“ in  Museum für Angewandte Kunst Frankfurt

Books
Fiell, Ch. &  P.  „1000 Chairs“ , Cologne 1997
Akira Kido „Art of tasteful furnishings“ Japan 2003
Aktion Plagiarius (Editor) „Kreuzschwinger® - Dynamisches Sitzen / Dynamic Seating", Berlin 2008

References

External links 
 Till Behrens's Website with further information about Kreuzschwinger

Chairs
Individual models of furniture